Limited Edition Sportswear, generally styled as LE, is an Australian sportswear clothing company which was established in 2008 in the city of Brisbane in Queensland. It is owned by its founder, Kris Pillay. Its slogan is "Cultured by Choice Branded with Innovation".
The company has a network of suppliers in UK, Australia, Pacific Islands including Samoa, Fiji, New Zealand and Papua New Guinea.

Sponsorships

Rugby Union
 (since 2016 – Until 2020)

Rugby League
 (2013-2017)
Wellington Rugby League
South Island Scorpions
Northern Swords

References

External links

Sports Gear Reviews

2008 establishments in Australia
Clothing companies established in 2008
Clothing brands of Australia
Sportswear brands
Sporting goods brands
Sporting goods manufacturers of Australia
Companies based in Brisbane